This is a list of wars involving the Czech Republic and its predecessor states.

Before 850

850-1526

1526-1918

Since 1918

References 

 
 
 
Czechia
Wars
Wars